The North Carolina Debutante Ball, also known as the  Terpsichorean Society Debutante Ball, is an annual debutante ball held in Raleigh, North Carolina. The ball, hosted by the Terpsichorean Club of Raleigh, is the oldest and most prestigious debutante ball in North Carolina. Originally organized in 1923 as the Raleigh Fall Festival, the formal debutante ball formed in 1927 with the founding of the Terpischorean Club. The ball is held every year over Labor Day weekend in downtown Raleigh.

History 
The North Carolina Debutante Ball was originated in 1923, when a group of merchants from Raleigh, North Carolina sponsored the Raleigh Fall Festival. Young women from prominent North Carolinian families were presented as candidates to be crowned as Queen of the Festival by the Governor of North Carolina. In 1927 the Terpsichorean Club, a secret society named after the Greek muse Terpsichore, was formed to organize and sponsor the first official North Carolina Debutante Ball. The annual ball was set to be held on the first weekend after Labor Day at the Raleigh Civic Center.

Over time, the debutante season expanded from one evening ball to a weekend including tea parties, luncheons, parties, and two formal dances held at Raleigh Memorial Auditorium. During this time, the tradition of having each debutante formally presented, as they were during the festival, was reestablished. Each debutante was escorted by a chief marshal and four assistant marshals. In 1956 the rules changed and the number of assistant marshals permitted was reduced to two. In 1953 the rules were changed again to allow fathers to serve as chief marshals for their daughters.

The ball was placed on a hiatus during World War II. In 1948 the ball was postponed until the week after Christmas due to a polio epidemic in the Piedmont Triad. In 1996 the ball was postponed again due to severe damage across the state from Hurricane Fran.

Modern ball 
Every year young women from around North Carolina, usually in their freshman or sophomore year of college, are nominated to be presented at the ball. Members of the Terpsichorean Club make the final selection of candidates. The women are selected from families who have made economic, social, cultural, or civic contributions to North Carolina. A "lead debutante" is selected every year from Wake County, as the seat of the state capitol. The ball weekend, still during Labor Day weekend, includes eight functions. The formal presentation of debutantes takes place at Meymandi Concert Hall in the Duke Energy Center for the Performing Arts in downtown Raleigh.

Notable debutantes 
 Adrian Thorpe Harrold Wood, American educator, writer, and blogger

References 

1923 establishments in North Carolina
Annual events in North Carolina
Balls in the United States
Dance in North Carolina
Debutante balls
Events in Raleigh, North Carolina
History of Raleigh, North Carolina
Summer events in the United States
Women in North Carolina